Paula Kauffman Wagner (born Paula Sue Kauffman) is an American film producer and film executive. Her most recent credits include the film Marshall starring Chadwick Boseman, Kate Hudson, Sterling K. Brown, and Josh Gad as well as the Broadway, West End, and US Tour productions of Pretty Woman: The Musical.

Early life
Wagner was born Paula Sue Kauffman in Youngstown, Ohio. Her mother, Sue Anna (née Shofstall), was a news magazine editor from Oklahoma, and her father, Edmund Jamison "Ned" Kauffman, Jr., was a business owner. While in Youngstown, Wagner frequently performed at the local playhouse. She received her BFA from Carnegie Mellon University in Pittsburgh, Pennsylvania, where she currently sits on the board of trustees.

Career

Early career
In her early career in New York, Wagner played several ensemble parts in the 1971 stage production of Lenny. Some of her additional credits include the role of Helena in A Midsummer Night's Dream at Yale Repertory Theatre as well as Maggie in Cat on a Hot Tin Roof at the Cleveland Play House. Her first marriage, to set designer Robin Wagner, brought her into the industry's A-list circles; she was present when director Michael Bennett shared ideas with Robin for A Chorus Line".

Agent and Film Producer
After her work on the stage, Wagner became a talent agent at Creative Artists Agency (CAA) in Los Angeles, where she signed and represented Tom Cruise. In July 1992, after representing Cruise for eleven years, she and Cruise co-founded the independent film production company Cruise/Wagner Productions. For the next fourteen years, Wagner and Cruise produced a wide range of films that earned numerous awards and widespread critical praise, and were global box office successes. The first film released under the C/W Productions banner was the international hit Mission: Impossible, the success of which brought the company the 1997 Producers Guild of America's Nova Award for Most Promising Producers in Theatrical Motion Pictures.

C/W Productions went on to produce such films as The Others, The Last Samurai, Vanilla Sky, Without Limits, Shattered Glass, Narc, Elizabethtown, and Ask the Dust, as well as  Steven Spielberg's War of the Worlds (which Wagner executive produced). C/W Productions was responsible for the original Mission: Impossible film trilogy (Mission: Impossible 2 and Mission: Impossible III). In all, films produced by C/W Productions earned more than $2.9 billion in worldwide box office receipts.

Wagner continues to work as a film producer and studio executive, developing films, theatre, and television through her company Chestnut Ridge Productions.

Through Chestnut Ridge Productions, her most recent film was Marshall, starring Chadwick Boseman, Josh Gad, Kate Hudson, and Sterling K. Brown; a story of a true law case early in the career of Thurgood Marshall. The movie was critically acclaimed and was nominated for one Academy Award.

Theatre Producer
Her Broadway producing credits include Pretty Woman: The Musical which also opened a production in Hamburg, Germany in September 2019, a production in on the West End in February 2020; there is a US National Tour in the works. Other Broadway theatrical productions include The Heiress starring Jessica Chastain, David Strathairn, and Dan Stevens and directed by Moisés Kaufman; it opened in the fall of 2012. She also produced the Broadway premiere of Craig Wright’s acclaimed play Grace, directed by Dexter Bullard and starring Paul Rudd, Michael Shannon, Kate Arrington, and Ed Asner in October 2012 and  Terrence McNally’s Tony-nominated play Mothers and Sons.

Other Producing and Notable Work
In addition to her work in film and theatre, Wagner also has produced for television and numerous awards ceremonies. She was an executive producer on the critically acclaimed and award winning Lifetime original movie Five, five short films directed by five female directors. She produced the Governors Awards ceremony for the Motion Picture Academy in 2013 and produced both the 2011 and 2012 Producers Guild of America Award show.

Wagner served on the board of the National Film Preservation Foundation through the Library of Congress and Carnegie Mellon University, where she received her degree and is an adjunct faculty member in the Master in Entertainment Industry Management program through the Heinz College.

Wagner is a member of the  American Cinematheque's Board of Directors and the Executive Committee of the UCLA’s School of Theater, Film and Television. She is also a member of the Academy of Motion Picture Arts and Sciences (AMPAS), the Producers Guild of America (PGA), The Broadway League and is an ambassador of ReFrame for Women In Film, a formal action plan to further gender parity in the media industry.

Awards and Accolades
Wagner was honored by Premiere magazine with the Women in Hollywood Icon Award in 2001. In October 2006, she received the Sherry Lansing Award from the Big Brothers and Big Sisters Organization. She was also honored by the Costume Designers Guild with its Swarovski President's Award in 2008. In 2012, she was an honoree at the Deauville Film Festival. She was one of the recipients of the Women in Film Crystal + Lucy Awards in 2016, and the Camerimage Producer with Unique Visual Sensitivity award in 2017. Her film Marshall won the Chicago “audience film festival award”.

Personal life
Wagner is married to Rick Nicita, CEO of management and production company RP Media. They have two sons, Zachary and Jesse. Wagner is Jewish.

Filmography
She was a producer in all films unless otherwise noted.

Film

Miscellaneous crew

Television

Miscellaneous crew

As an actress

As writer

References

External links

Year of birth missing (living people)
American film producers
Carnegie Mellon University College of Fine Arts alumni
Carnegie Mellon University faculty
Carnegie Mellon University trustees
Living people
Businesspeople from Youngstown, Ohio
American independent film production company founders
American talent agents